Clarence J. Fogg was an American sailor and politician who served as a member of the Massachusetts House of Representatives and as the forty first mayor of Newburyport, Massachusetts.

Early life
Fogg was born in Newburyport, Massachusetts on July 10, 1853.

Business career
Fogg spent twenty years at sea, after which he became a shoe cutter.

Political career
Fogg was a Member of the Newbury Common Council in 1900, and from 1901 to 1902 a member of the Board of Aldermen from Ward 2

Notes

External links
Worcester Mayors

1853 births
Massachusetts city council members
Mayors of Newburyport, Massachusetts
Republican Party members of the Massachusetts House of Representatives
1936 deaths